Osmosis is a French science fiction streaming television series created by Audrey Fouché. The first season, consisting of eight episodes, was released on 29 March 2019 on Netflix. The series stars Hugo Becker, Agathe Bonitzer, Stéphane Pitti, Gaël Kamilindi, Suzanne Rault-Balet, Luna Silva, Manoel Dupont and Yuming Hey.

On 17 January 2020, Netflix cancelled the series after one season.

Synopsis
Set in near-future Paris, the science-fiction drama sees a new dating app called Osmosis developed that can decode true love, digging deep into its users' brain data to find a perfect match with 100% accuracy. But is there a price to pay when letting an algorithm decide whom you will love, using technology that can access the innermost recesses of your mind and your best-kept secrets?

Cast and characters

Main
 Hugo Becker as Paul Vanhove, CEO of Osmosis and first tester of the implant.
 Agathe Bonitzer as Esther Vanhove, Paul's sister and technical genius creator of Osmosis 
 Stéphane Pitti as Lucas Apert
 Gaël Kamilindi as Gabriel
 Suzanne Rault-Balet as Swann
 Luna Silva as Ana Stern
 Manoel Dupont as Niels Larsen
 Yuming Hey as Billie Tual

Recurring
 Vincent Renaudet as Martin, the AI of Osmosis
 Lena Laprès as Claire Salomon
 Philypa Phoenix as Joséphine Vanhove, Paul's wife.
 Lionel Lingelser as Léopold Goulard
 Fabien Ducommun as Antoine Fouché
 Waly Dia as Simon
 Aurélia Petit as Louise Vanhove
 Christiane Conil as Cécile Larsen
 Laure-Lucile Simon as Eloan Spivack 
 Dimitri Storoge as Mathieu Christo
 Pierre Hancisse as Samuel Kahn
 Sarah-Jane Sauvegrain as Romy
 Camille-François Nicol as Tom
 Jeremy Lewin as Romeo
 Jimmy Labeeu as Ilyes

Production

Development
On 11 May 2017, it was announced that Netflix had given the production a series order for a first season consisting of eight episodes. The series is created by Audrey Fouché, who is credited as an executive producer. Osmosis is based on an idea from a former project of the same title created by Louis Chiche, William Chiche and Gabriel Chiche and produced by Telfrance and Arte in 2015. In February 2019, it was announced that the series would premiere on 29 March 2019. The production company reportedly spent a budget of 8 million euros for the first season, with each episode costing €1 million. On 1 April 2019, it was confirmed that Audrey Fouché departed the series as a showrunner after the first season. On 17 January 2020, Netflix cancelled the series after one season.

Casting
In August 2018, it was announced that Hugo Becker, Agathe Bonitzer, Stephane Pitti, Gael Kamilindi and Suzanne Rault-Balet had been cast in the series. In February 2019, it was announced that Luna Silva, Manoel Dupont and Yuming Hey were added to the cast.

Filming
Principal photography for the first season took place on location in Paris in 2018.

Episodes

Release
On 28 February 2019, the official trailer for the series was released.

Premiere
On 24 March 2019, the series held its official premiere with the screening of the first two episodes at the Series Mania International Festival in Lille, France.

Reception
The first season received positive reviews upon its release. The review aggregator website Rotten Tomatoes reported a 100% approval rating with an average rating of 6/10 based on 5 reviews.

Noah Berlatsky from The Verge mentioned in a positive review of the first two episodes of the series, that "Technology in Osmosis doesn't create a dystopia or a utopia in itself. It's just a tool, and different people project different dreams and fears onto it, for better and worse" and that this "level of nuance and awareness makes Osmosis start out thoughtful and refreshing." Greg Wheeler from The Review Geek recommended the first season in their review of the series by stating that "Osmosis is a really thrilling sci-fi trip, one asking some big questions around love and relationships while delivering a well written story full of twists and turns along the way."

Devin Townsend from The Breeze complimented the first season in his review by adding that the series is "thought-provoking and edges on the air of irony. It relies on the audience's knowledge of the challenging world of dating and how cynical the human race is becoming with their choice of an "other half"." In a positive review of the series, Jon O'Brien from i-D wrote that, "Osmosis delivers a more optimistic proclamation. Humankind and machines can in fact live in relative harmony, and without the fear of murderous robot dogs, head-exploding video games or hashtag-powered genocides. And should disaster strike, it's more likely to be us pesky humans to blame."

Emma Stefansky from Thrillist praised the series, stating that "Osmosis joins the ranks of shows like the German time-travel thriller Dark, the Danish zombie eco-pocalypse The Rain, and the South Korean medieval drama Kingdom, creating a subgenre within Netflix of remarkably good foreign-language genre television" and further adding that it "is the kind of show you can just sit and absorb." Laurie Clarke of Techworld gave the series a positive recommendation saying that its "handling of a technologically entwined future is much more subtle than the at-times hamfisted approach of Black Mirror and it breathes some much-needed humanity back into tech-centric fictions."

References

External links
 
 

2010s French drama television series
2010s LGBT-related drama television series
2010s science fiction television series
2019 French television series debuts
2019 French television series endings
Dystopian television series
Espionage television series
French-language Netflix original programming
French LGBT-related television shows
French science fiction television series
Hard science fiction
LGBT-related web series
Malware in fiction
Nanotechnology in fiction
Serial drama television series
Television series about artificial intelligence
Television series set in the future
Television series set in the 21st century
Television shows set in Paris
French web series